Deransko Lake is a lake of Bosnia and Herzegovina. It is located in the Hutovo Blato, nature reserve and bird reserve located near Čapljina.

See also
List of lakes in Bosnia and Herzegovina

References

Lakes of Bosnia and Herzegovina